The Canadian Malartic Mine is a gold mine  west of Val-d'Or in Quebec, Canada. It is the largest operating gold mine in Canada.

The mineral deposit was discovered in 1923 and Osisko Mining began commercial mining operations in 2011. The mine came under equal ownership of Agnico-Eagle Mines and Yamana Gold in June 2014. 

It is expected that the mine will continue operations at the Malartic and Barnat pits through until 2029 while the new Odyssey site will continue until 2039.

References

Gold mines in Canada
Surface mines in Canada
Mines in Quebec